Torodora rectivalvata is a moth in the family Lecithoceridae described by Kyu-Tek Park in 2007. It is found in Chiang Mai Province, Thailand.

The wingspan is 17.5–18 mm. The forewings are elongate and broader towards the apex. The ground colour is shiny brownish orange, often with a large pale orange, quadrate area mesially on the upper surface. The hindwings are pale yellowish brown.

Etymology
The specific name is derived from the Latin rectus (meaning straight) and refers to the straight costa of the valva.

References

Torodora
Moths of Asia
Moths described in 2007